Telephone and Data Systems, Inc. is a Chicago-based telecommunications service company providing wireless products and services; cable and wireline broadband, TV and voice services; and hosted and managed services to approximately 6 million customers nationwide through its business units TDS Telecom and U.S. Cellular and OneNeck IT Solutions.

The company began as a rural phone company in Wisconsin in 1969. In 1983 it founded U.S. Cellular as a subsidiary. In 2001, it acquired Straus Printing Company and combined it with a previously acquired printing company, Suttle Press, to form Suttle-Straus as another subsidiary.

LeRoy T. Carlson, the founder of TDS, died in May 2016 at the age of 100.

References

External links
Telephone and Data Systems, Inc. website

Telecommunications companies of the United States
Telephony
Companies based in Chicago
Telecommunications companies established in 1969
Companies listed on the New York Stock Exchange